Ralph Brazelton Peck (June 23, 1912 – February 18, 2008) was a civil engineer specializing in soil mechanics. He was awarded the National Medal of Science in 1976 "for his development of the science and art of subsurface engineering, combining the contributions of the sciences of geology and soil mechanics with the practical art of foundation design"?

Peck was born in Winnipeg to O.C. and Ethel Peck, and moved to the United States at age six. In 1934, he received his civil engineer degree from Rensselaer Polytechnic Institute and was given a three-year fellowship for graduate work in structures. On June 14, 1938, he married Marjorie Truby and obtained a Doctor of Civil Engineering degree.

After receiving his degree, he worked briefly for the American Bridge Company, then on the Chicago Subway, but Peck spent the majority of his teaching career (33 years) at the University of Illinois Urbana-Champaign, initially in structures but later focused on geotechnical engineering under the influence of Karl Terzaghi, ultimately retiring in 1975. He continued to work until 2006 and was highly influential as a consulting engineer, with some 1,046 consulting projects in foundations, ore storage facilities, tunnel projects, dams, and dikes, including the Cannelton and Uniontown lock and dam construction failures on the Ohio River, the dams in the James Bay project, the Trans-Alaska Pipeline System, the Dead Sea dikes and the Rion-Antirion Bridge in Greece.

On May 8, 2009, the Norwegian Geotechnical Institute in Oslo, Norway, opened the Ralph B. Peck Library. This Library is next to the Karl Terzaghi Library, also at NGI. Correspondence between these two men are part of the two working libraries. The Karl  Terzaghi Library tells about the birth and growth of soil mechanics. The Ralph B. Peck Library tells about the practice of foundation engineering, and how one engineer exercised his art and science for more than sixty years. Diaries from between 1940 and 1942 containing Peck's work with the Chicago Subway are included along with papers and reports on many of his subsequent jobs.

During his career Peck authored over 201 publications, and served as president of the International Society of Soil Mechanics and Foundation Engineering from 1970 to 1974. He received many awards, including:

 1945 The Norman Medal of the American Society of Civil Engineers
 1966 The Wellington prize of the ASCE
 1960 The Karl Terzaghi Award
 1976 The National Medal of Science, presented by President Gerald Ford
 1989 The John Fritz Medal

In 2000, the American Society of Civil Engineers (ASCE) created the Ralph B. Peck Award to honor outstanding contributions to geotechnical engineering profession through the publication of a thoughtful, carefully researched case history or histories, or the publication of recommended practices or design methodologies based on the evaluation of case histories.

He died on February 18, 2009, from congestive heart failure.

References

Further reading 
 Norwegian Geotechnical Institute retrospective
 "Ralph B. Peck, Educator and Engineer – The Essence of the Man", edited by John Dunnicliff and Nancy Peck Young, BiTech Publishers Ltd, Vancouver, CA, 2007

External links

 Obituary in The Times, 12 March 2008
 Observational Method Technology Review, InfoMine.com

1912 births
2008 deaths
Geotechnical engineers
Rensselaer Polytechnic Institute alumni
National Medal of Science laureates
American civil engineers
Rankine Lecturers
People from Winnipeg
20th-century American engineers
Canadian emigrants to the United States